Angraecum leonis is a species of flowering plant in the Orchidaceae family.

Description

Forms 
Two different forms of this species exist. The form native to the Comoros is considerably larger and nearly twice as big as the one native to Madagascar.

Cytology
The diploid chromosome count of this species is 2n = 40, or 2n = 38.

Ecology

Pollination
The sphingophilous flowers are fragrant during the night.

Etymology
It is named after Léon Humblot, a French orchid collector.

Physiology

Floral fragrance
The floral fragrance is primarily composed of chavicol (70%), followed by benzyl salicylate (7.3%), benzyl benzoate  (5.5%), methyl nicotinate (5.3%), as well as many more compounds in smaller quantities.

Horticulture
It can be successfully cultivated in intermediate temperatures. It can be mounted on cork and bark, but it can also grow potted in bark pieces. It should be grown in shade to semi-shade.

Images

References

leonis
Taxa named by Édouard André
Taxa named by Heinrich Gustav Reichenbach
Flora of Madagascar
Flora of the Comoros